Soul Power! is an album by jazz organist Richard "Groove" Holmes which was recorded in 1967 and released on the Prestige label.

Reception

Allmusic awarded the album 3½ stars stating "It's relaxed and funky, organ-paced small-combo music, Holmes perhaps breaking out less of a sweat than some of his more bop-influenced and frenetic contemporaries".

Track listing 
 "Soul Power" (Richard "Groove" Holmes) - 5:50  
 "Gimme Little Sign" (Jerry Winn, Alfred Smith, Joe Hooven) - 2:30  
 "How Can I Be Sure" (Eddie Brigati, Felix Cavaliere) - 5:00  
 "Sunny" (Bobby Hebb) - 5:35 
 "Since I Fell for You" (Buddy Johnson) - 8:25  
 "The Preacher" (Horace Silver) - 7:15  
 "Girl Talk" (Neal Hefti, Bobby Troup) - 5:50

Personnel 
Richard "Groove" Holmes - organ
Wally Richardson, Steve Wolfe - guitar
Jimmy Lewis - electric bass
Ben Dixon - drums
Dave Blume - congas

References 

Richard Holmes (organist) albums
1968 albums
Prestige Records albums
Albums recorded at Van Gelder Studio
Albums produced by Cal Lampley